was a Japanese novelist and non-fiction writer, born in North Hamgyong, a province of what is now North Korea.  He was interested in high-profile crimes in Japan and published a number of non-fiction books about Japanese crimes.

On January 14, 1976, Saki was awarded the Naoki Prize for the novel Vengeance Is Mine based on Japanese serial killer Akira Nishiguchi. The novel became the basis of Shohei Imamura's film Vengeance Is Mine. He also wrote the books about Norio Nagayama, Tsutomu Miyazaki, Fusako Sano and Futoshi Matsunaga.

In 1992, Saki published a book about Japanese Resident-General of Korea Itō Hirobumi and Korean An Jung-geun, titled Itō Hirobumi to An Jung-geun.

On 1 November 2015, he died from throat cancer in Kitakyūshū at age 78.

References

External links

1937 births
2015 deaths
20th-century Japanese novelists
21st-century Japanese novelists
Japanese non-fiction writers
Deaths from cancer in Japan
People from North Hamgyong
Male novelists
Naoki Prize winners
20th-century Japanese male writers
21st-century male writers
Deaths from throat cancer
Male non-fiction writers